Troitsk is a rural locality (a settlement) in Kalmansky Selsoviet, Kalmansky District, Altai Krai, Russia. The population was 605 as of 2013. There are 7 streets.

Geography 
Troitsk is located on the right bank of the Kalmanka River, 4 km southeast of Kalmanka (the district's administrative centre) by road. Kalmanka is the nearest rural locality.

References 

Rural localities in Kalmansky District